The Milwaukee Riverwalk is a continuous pedestrian walkway along the Milwaukee River in downtown Milwaukee, Wisconsin.

Description 
Conceived in the 1990s to increase public access to the waterway, the Milwaukee Riverwalk has grown to include art displays called RiverSculpture!, the RiverSplash! festival (which ended a 20-year run in 2009), Riverwalk Park, water taxi landings, and other venues such as cafés, and brewpubs.

The Milwaukee Riverwalk extends from the Historic Third Ward district to Caesars Park near Brady Street. It also links to the Henry Aaron State Trail, Lakeshore State Park, and Erie Street Plaza. There are three segments of the Milwaukee Riverwalk: the Beerline B, East Town (Juneautown) & Westown (Kilbourntown), and the 3rd & 5th Ward. The Beerline B runs from McKinley Avenue to Caesars Park, the East Town (Juneautown) & Westown (Kilbourntown) section from Juneau Avenue to I-794, and the 3rd & 5th Ward section from I-794 to Lake Michigan.  

Cemented in to the walkways are 18 bronze medallions drawn by elementary school children, depicting how they see the Milwaukee River.

References

External links
 A stroll along the RiverWalk
 Milwaukee Riverwalk Project

Transportation in Milwaukee
Culture of Milwaukee
Redeveloped ports and waterfronts in the United States
Tourist attractions in Milwaukee